Tobias Fjeld Gulliksen (born 9 July 2003) is a Norwegian football midfielder who currently plays for Strømsgodset.

Joining Strømsgodset's youth setup in 2015 from Konnerud IL, he represented Norway as a youth international for the first time in 2018. In 2019 he and his older brother Mathias signed professional contracts with Strømsgodset, albeit with a place in the B team squad. Tobias Fjeld Gulliksen prolonged his contract in late 2019, while also being benched for the senior team and playing friendly matches. He made his league debut in June 2020 against Aalesund.

Career statistics

References

2003 births
Living people
Sportspeople from Drammen
Norwegian footballers
Association football midfielders
Eliteserien players
Strømsgodset Toppfotball players